John Davenport (29 September 1765 – 12 December 1848) was one of the most financially successful English industrial potters, founder of the Davenport Pottery firm in Longport in The Potteries. He served as the Conservative M.P. for Stoke from 1832 to 1841.

A native of the nearby rural town of Leek, he worked for a while for a local bank then in 1794 he set himself up as a pottery manufacturer in Longport, Stoke-on-Trent. His ruthless business sense combined with the technical breakthroughs of Wedgwood and Spode, and made his firm a formidable force in the growing export trade from the Potteries.

He married Diana Ward in 1795 and they had two daughters and three sons. Davenport resided at Westwood Hall from 1813, and the running of his business began to pass to his son Henry in the 1820s. This left Davenport time to become involved in politics. He served in the Commons as a diligent local M.P. until 1841. He was also deputy lieutenant for Staffordshire.

A portrait of Davenport by an unknown artist is held by the Potteries Museum & Art Gallery.

References

External links 
 

1765 births
1848 deaths
English potters
English industrialists
Conservative Party (UK) MPs for English constituencies
UK MPs 1832–1835
UK MPs 1835–1837
UK MPs 1837–1841
Deputy Lieutenants of Staffordshire
Staffordshire pottery
Members of the Parliament of the United Kingdom for English constituencies